The Man Who Used the Universe is a science fiction novel by Alan Dean Foster published in 1983.

Plot summary
The Man Who Used the Universe is a novel in which Kees vaan Loo-Macklin rises from an illegal to a position of high power.

Reception
Ken Ramstead reviewed The Man Who Used the Universe in Ares Magazine #17 and commented that "Foster demands much credulity from his readers. But he also delivers much in return."

Reviews
Review by C. J. Henderson [as by Chris Henderson] (1983) in Dragon Magazine, November 1983
Review by Tom Easton (1984) in Analog Science Fiction/Science Fact, February 1984
Science Fiction Review

References

1983 novels